The Kazakhstan national badminton team represents Kazakhstan in international badminton team competitions. The national team is controlled by the National Badminton Federation of Republic of Kazakhstan, the governing body for badminton in Kazakhstan. 

The Kazakhstani team debuted in the Sudirman Cup in 1989 Sudirman Cup, when the team was playing as part of the Soviet Union national team. The mixed team also played in the 2019 Sudirman Cup and was placed into Group 4 with Greenland and Macau. The Kazakhstani team won both ties and finished in 30th place.

The men's and women's team have participated in the Badminton Asia Team Championships. The best result was when the women's team reached the quarterfinals in the 2020 Badminton Asia Team Championships.

Participation in BWF competitions

Sudirman Cup

Participation in Badminton Asia competitions

Men's team

Women's team

Mixed team

Participation in Badminton Asia Regional competitions

Central Asia 

Mixed team U17

Mixed team U15

Current squad

Men's squad 
The following squad was selected to represent the Kazakhstan men's team at the 2022 Badminton Asia Team Championships.

Women's squad 
The following squad was selected to represent the Kazakhstan women's team at the 2022 Badminton Asia Team Championships.

References

Badminton
National badminton teams
Badminton in Kazakhstan